The 2006 Mozambique earthquake occurred at 22:19 UTC on 22 February. It had a magnitude of 7.0 on the moment magnitude scale and caused 4 deaths and 36 injuries. The epicenter was near Machaze in Manica Province of southern Mozambique, just north of the Save River. It was the largest historical earthquake in Mozambique and the first earthquake in southern Africa to have an identified surface rupture.

Tectonic setting
Southern Mozambique is at the southern end of the East Africa Rift system, where the African Plate appears to be breaking into several smaller plates. The Somali Plate is moving westward relative to the Nubian Plate at a rate of several millimetres a year at the latitude of this earthquake. Most earthquakes in this zone are a result of either normal or strike-slip faulting.

Earthquake

The earthquake was felt throughout Mozambique and over a wide area of eastern southern Africa, including South Africa, Swaziland, Zambia, Zimbabwe and Botswana. Close to the epicentre the shaking reached VIII in intensity on the Mercalli intensity scale. In the cities of Beira, Inhambane and Maputo the intensity reached V.

The focal mechanism of the earthquake is consistent with normal faulting on a westerly dipping fault plane. Field investigations identified 15 km of surface rupture in the form of a west-facing scarp, with up to 2.05 m of vertical displacement, although it was not possible to prove the full extent of surface faulting due to lack of time and the presence of minefields. Investigations using Interferometric synthetic aperture radar (InSAR), combined with field and seismological observations, have identified two fault segments with slightly differing strikes, with the hypocenter and most of the displacement being on the more southerly of the segments.

Damage

Little damage was recorded, with only 294 buildings reported as damaged in the area between Espungabera, Beira and Chimoio. A total of four deaths were recorded, one in Espungabera, one in Machaze and two in Beira, with a further thirty-six injured.

See also
 List of earthquakes in 2006

References

External links

2006 earthquakes
Earthquakes in Mozambique
2006 in Mozambique
February 2006 events in Africa
Manica Province
Earthquakes in South Africa
Earthquakes in Eswatini
Earthquakes in Zambia
Earthquakes in Zimbabwe
Earthquakes in Botswana
2006 in South Africa
2006 in Swaziland
2006 in Zambia
2006 in Zimbabwe
2006 in Botswana